Michel Gérard Parizeau (born April 9, 1948) is a Canadian former professional ice hockey left winger and head coach who played two seasons in the National Hockey League (NHL) for the St. Louis Blues and Philadelphia Flyers.

Parizeau also played seven seasons in the World Hockey Association (WHA) for the Quebec Nordiques, Indianapolis Racers and Cincinnati Stingers.

Career statistics

References

External links
 

1948 births
Canadian ice hockey left wingers
Chicoutimi Saguenéens coaches
Cincinnati Stingers players
Drummondville Rangers players
Drummondville Voltigeurs coaches
French Quebecers
Indianapolis Racers players
Living people
New York Rangers draft picks
Omaha Knights (CHL) players
Philadelphia Flyers players
Quebec Nordiques (WHA) players
St. Louis Blues players
Ice hockey people from Montreal
Canadian ice hockey coaches